The Pratt & Whitney J75 (civilian designation: JT4A) is an axial-flow turbojet engine first flown in 1955. A two-spool design in the 17,000 lbf (76 kN) thrust class, the J75 was essentially the bigger brother of the Pratt & Whitney J57 (JT3C). It was known in civilian service as the JT4A, and in a variety of stationary roles as the GG4 and FT4.

Design and development

In military use, the J75 was used on the Convair F-106 Delta Dart, Lockheed U-2, and Republic F-105 Thunderchief. It was also utilized in the prototype and experimental Avro Canada CF-105 Arrow, Lockheed A-12, Martin P6M SeaMaster, North American YF-107, and Vought XF8U-3 Crusader III.

Before the arrival of the Pratt & Whitney JT3D turbofan engine, the JT4A was used to power certain Boeing 707 and Douglas DC-8 models, bringing improved field performance in the medium-range Boeing 707-220 and Douglas DC-8-20, and intercontinental range in the Boeing 707-320 and the Douglas DC-8-30.  By late 1959, P&W had considered introducing a turbofan version of the J75, which was to have tentatively been named the TF75 or JT4D. Apparently, little interest was shown by the aircraft industry, so the variant was dropped.

Marine & power generation
Well-known uses include the first all-turbine warships, the Canadian s, as well as the United States Coast Guard's s, the 1970s-built icebreakers Polar Sea and Polar Star (each 3 engines in CODOG configuration), and it was considered for the US Navy's . The same basic powerplant saw much wider use as a peak demand power turbine running on natural gas. From its introduction in 1960 over 1,000 FT4s have been sold, with many of them still in operation for electrical generation. Outdated by modern standards, refits are available that add catalytic converters to lower their emissions.

Variants
J75-P-1
J75-P-3  thrust
J75-P-5  thrust
J75-P-9
J75-P-11
J75-P-13B  thrust
J75-P-15W  afterburning thrust
J75-P-17  afterburning thrust
J75-P-19  afterburning thrust
J75-P-19W  afterburning thrust with water injection
JT4A-3 
JT4A-4 
JT4A-9 
JT4A-11  thrust
JT4A-29 (J75-P-19W)  afterburning thrust with water injection

Applications

J75
 Avro Canada CF-105 Mk1 Arrow
 Convair F-106 Delta Dart
 Lockheed A-12
 Lockheed U-2
 Martin P6M SeaMaster
 North American F-107
 Republic F-105 Thunderchief
 Vought XF8U-3 Crusader III

JT4A
 Boeing 707 (specifically, the 707-220 and 707-320)
 Douglas DC-8 (specifically, the DC-8-20 and DC-8-30)

Specifications (JT4A-11)

See also

Notes

References

External links

 Pratt & Whitney J75/JT4 webpage

J75
1950s turbojet engines